Elio Augusto Di Carlo (2 September 1918, Amatrice, Italy – 27 July 1998, Cantalupo in Sabina, Italy), was an Italian ornithologist, historian and physician.

Italian ornithologists
20th-century Italian physicians
20th-century Italian historians
People from the Province of Rieti
1998 deaths
1918 births
20th-century Italian zoologists